Ik had een wapenbroeder is a novel by Dutch author Maarten 't Hart. It was first published in 1973.

Novels by Maarten 't Hart
1973 novels